Point Hope Airport  is a state-owned public-use airport located two miles (3 km) southwest of the central business district of Point Hope, a city in the North Slope Borough of the U.S. state of Alaska. Point Hope is located in the Lisburne Peninsula, on the Chukchi Sea coast.

Facilities

As per Federal Aviation Administration records, the airport had 4,580 commercial passenger boardings (enplanements) in calendar year 2005 and 4,900 enplanements (4,359 scheduled and 541 unscheduled) in 2006.  According to the FAA's National Plan of Integrated Airport Systems for 2007–2011, it is classified as commercial service - non-primary because it has between 2,500 and 10,000 passenger boardings per year.

Airlines and destinations 

Prior to its bankruptcy and cessation of all operations, Ravn Alaska served the airport from multiple locations.

References

External links 
 FAA Alaska airport diagram (GIF)
 

Airports in North Slope Borough, Alaska
Chukchi Sea